The following are incomplete lists of golf courses in Canada by province and territory.

Alberta 
All golf courses listed and their related information are from Alberta Golf's member club directory unless referenced otherwise.

The following is list of golf courses in Alberta.

British Columbia 
The following is an incomplete list of golf courses in British Columbia.

Bear Mountain Golf Club
Sagebrush Golf Club
Shaughnessy Golf & Country Club
Sun Peaks Golf Course
University Golf Club
Vancouver Golf Club
Victoria Golf Club
Westwood Plateau Golf & Country Club

Manitoba 

The following is an incomplete list of golf courses in Manitoba.

Black Bear Golf Course, 9 holes (Public)
Granite Hills Golf Course, 18 holes (Public)
Niakwa Country Club
Oak Island Golf , 18 holes
Pinawa Golf & Country Club, 18 holes (Public) 
Pine Falls Golf Course, 9 holes (Public)
St. Charles Country Club

Newfoundland and Labrador 

The following is an incomplete list of golf courses in Newfoundland and Labrador.
Amaruk Golf Club
Bally Haly Golf & Curling Club 
Blomidon Golf & Country Club 
Brookside Golf Resort
Clovelly Golf Club
Dhoon Lodge Golf Course
Gander Golf Club
GlenDenning Golf Club
Grand Falls Golf Club 
Grande Meadows Golf Club
Gros Morne Golf Resort
Harmon Links 
Humber River Golf Club 
Humber Valley Golf Resort
Pippy Park Golf Club
Pitcher's Pond Golf Course
St. Andrews na Creige Golf Course
Tamarack Golf Club 
Twin Rivers Golf Course
The View Golf Resort
The Wilds at Salmonier River Golf Club 
The Willows at Holyrood Golf Course

New Brunswick 

The following is an incomplete list of golf courses in New Brunswick.
Aroostook Valley Golf Club
Bouctouche Golf Club
Carman Creek GOLF/FootGOLF Course & Practice Facility
Covered Bridge Golf Club
Country Meadows Golf Club
Fox Creek Golf Club
Fraser Edmundston Golf Club
Fredericton Golf Club
Fundy National Park Golf Club
Gage Golf and Curling Club
Grand Falls Golf Club (New Brunswick)
Gowan Brae Golf and Country Club
Hampton Golf Club
Herring Cove Provincial Park and Golf Course
Kingswood Golf Club
Lakeside Golf and Country Club
Mactaquac Golf Course and Provincial Park
Maplewood Golf Club
Memramcook Valley Golf Club
Midland Meadows Golf Club
Miramichi Golf and Country Club
Moncton Golf and Country Club
Mountain Woods Golf Club
Nackawic Golf Club
Old Mill Pond Golf and Country Club
Petitcodiac Valley Golf Club
Pine Needles Golf Club (New Brunswick)
Plaster Rock Golf Club
Pokemouche Golf Club
Restigouche Golf Club
Riverbend Golf Club
Riverside Golf Club (New Brunswick)
Rockwood Park Golf Club
Royal Oaks Golf Club
Sackville Golf and Country Club
Saint Quentin Golf Club
Squire Green Golf Club
St. George Golf Club
St Ignace Golf Club
St. Stephen Golf Club
Sussex Golf and Curling Club
Tabusintac Region Golf and Country Club
Washademoak Golf Club
Welsford Golf Club
Westfield Golf and Country Club
West Hills Golf Club
Woodstock Golf Club

Northwest Territories 

The following is an incomplete list of golf courses in Northwest Territories.
Yellowknife Golf Club
Hay River Golf Club

Nova Scotia 

The following is an incomplete list of golf courses in Nova Scotia.
Highlands Links
Fox Harb'r Golf Resort & Spa
Cabot Links
Cabot Cliffs
Bell Bay
Dundee Golf and Country Club
Lingan Golf and Country Club
Ken Wo Golf & Country Club
Eagles Crest Golf Course
Berwick Heights Golf Club
Avon Valley Golf Club
Island Green Golf Course
Glen Lovat Golf Club
Northumberland Links
Abercrombie Golf & Country Club
Pictou Golf & Country Club
Coyote Hill Golf Club
Yarmouth Golf & Country Club
River Run Golf Club
Truro Golf & Country Club
Mountain Golf Course
Antigonish Golf & Country Club
Granite Springs Golf Club
Chester Golf Club
Ashburn Golf Club
Pubnico Golf Club
Sherwood Golf & Country Club
Oakfield Golf & Country Club
Amherst Golf Club
River Oaks Golf Club
Glen Arbour Golf Course

Nunavut

Ontario

Prince Edward Island 
The following is a list of golf courses in Prince Edward Island.
Andersons Creek Golf Club
Avondale Golf Course
Belfast Highland Greens Golf Course
Belvedere Golf Club
Brudenell River Golf Course
Clyde River Golf & Country Club
Countryview Golf Club
Dundarave Golf Course
Eagles Glenn of Cavendish
Forest Hills Golf Course
Fox Meadow Golf & Country Club
Glasgow Hills Resort & Golf Club
Glen Afton Golf Club
Green Gables Golf Course
The Links at Crowbush Cove
Mill River Golf Course
Red Sands Golf Course
Rustico Resort Golf & Tennis Club
Stanhope Golf & Country Club
St. Felix Golf & Country Club

Quebec 

The following is an incomplete list of golf courses in Quebec.
Country Club of Montreal
Gray Rocks
Maisonneuve Park
Mount Bruno Golf Club
Rivermead Golf Club
Royal Montreal Golf Club
Royal Ottawa Golf Club 
Royal Quebec Golf Club
Inverugie Golf Club
Falcon Golf Club

Saskatchewan

Yukon 
Dawson City Golf Course
Greenway's Greens Golf Course
Meadow Lakes Golf Course
Mountain View Golf Course

References 

 
Canada
Golf courses
Golf courses